The Otidimorphae is a clade of birds that contains the orders Cuculiformes (cuckoos), Musophagiformes (turacos), and Otidiformes (bustards) identified in 2014 by genome analysis. While the bustards seem to be related to the turacos, other genetic studies have found the cuckoos to be closer to the bustards than the turacos are.

References

Neognathae